Color temperature is the color of light emitted by an idealized opaque, non-reflective body at a particular temperature measured in kelvins. The color temperature scale is used to categorize the color of light emitted by other light sources regardless of their temperature.

Color temperature is a characteristic of visible light that has important applications in lighting, photography, videography, publishing, manufacturing, astrophysics, horticulture, and other fields. In practice, color temperature is meaningful only for light sources that do in fact correspond somewhat closely to the color of some black body, i.e., light in a range going from red to orange to yellow to white to bluish white; it does not make sense to speak of the color temperature of, e.g., a green or a purple light. Color temperature is conventionally expressed in kelvins, using the symbol K, a unit of measure for absolute temperature.

Color temperatures over 5000 K are called "cool colors" (bluish), while lower color temperatures (2700–3000 K) are called "warm colors" (yellowish). "Warm" in this context is an analogy to radiated heat flux of traditional incandescent lighting rather than temperature. The spectral peak of warm-colored light is closer to infrared, and most natural warm-colored light sources emit significant infrared radiation. The fact that "warm" lighting in this sense actually has a "cooler" color temperature often leads to confusion.

Categorizing different lighting

The color temperature of the electromagnetic radiation emitted from an ideal black body is defined as its surface temperature in kelvins, or alternatively in micro reciprocal degrees (mired). This permits the definition of a standard by which light sources are compared.

To the extent that a hot surface emits thermal radiation but is not an ideal black-body radiator, the color temperature of the light is not the actual temperature of the surface. An incandescent lamp's light is thermal radiation, and the bulb approximates an ideal black-body radiator, so its color temperature is essentially the temperature of the filament. Thus a relatively low temperature emits a dull red and a high temperature emits the almost white of the traditional incandescent light bulb. Metal workers are able to judge the temperature of hot metals by their color, from dark red to orange-white and then white (see red heat).

Many other light sources, such as fluorescent lamps, or light emitting diodes (LEDs) emit light primarily by processes other than thermal radiation. This means that the emitted radiation does not follow the form of a black-body spectrum. These sources are assigned what is known as a correlated color temperature (CCT). CCT is the color temperature of a black-body radiator which to human color perception most closely matches the light from the lamp. Because such an approximation is not required for incandescent light, the CCT for an incandescent light is simply its unadjusted temperature, derived from comparison to a black-body radiator.

The Sun
The Sun closely approximates a black-body radiator. The effective temperature, defined by the total radiative power per square unit, is about 5780 K. The color temperature of sunlight above the atmosphere is about 5900 K.

The Sun may appear red, orange, yellow, or white from Earth, depending on its position in the sky. The changing color of the Sun over the course of the day is mainly a result of the scattering of sunlight and is not due to changes in black-body radiation. Rayleigh scattering of sunlight by Earth's atmosphere causes the blue color of the sky, which tends to scatter blue light more than red light.

Some daylight in the early morning and late afternoon (the golden hours) has a lower ("warmer") color temperature due to increased scattering of shorter-wavelength sunlight by atmospheric particles – an optical phenomenon called the Tyndall effect.

Daylight has a spectrum similar to that of a black body with a correlated color temperature of 6500 K (D65 viewing standard) or 5500 K (daylight-balanced photographic film standard).

For colors based on black-body theory, blue occurs at higher temperatures, whereas red occurs at lower temperatures. This is the opposite of the cultural associations attributed to colors, in which "red" is "hot", and "blue" is "cold".

Applications

Lighting

For lighting building interiors, it is often important to take into account the color temperature of illumination. A warmer (i.e., a lower color temperature) light is often used in public areas to promote relaxation, while a cooler (higher color temperature) light is used to enhance concentration, for example in schools and offices.

CCT dimming for LED technology is regarded as a difficult task, since binning, age and temperature drift effects of LEDs change the actual color value output. Here feedback loop systems are used, for example with color sensors, to actively monitor and control the color output of multiple color mixing LEDs.

Aquaculture

In fishkeeping, color temperature has different functions and foci in the various branches.

 In freshwater aquaria, color temperature is generally of concern only for producing a more attractive display. Lights tend to be designed to produce an attractive spectrum, sometimes with secondary attention paid to keeping the plants in the aquaria alive.
 In a saltwater/reef aquarium, color temperature is an essential part of tank health.  Within about 400 to 3000 nanometers, light of shorter wavelength can penetrate deeper into water than longer wavelengths, providing essential energy sources to the algae hosted in (and sustaining) coral. This is equivalent to an increase of color temperature with water depth in this spectral range. Because coral typically live in shallow water and receive intense, direct tropical sunlight, the focus was once on simulating this situation with 6500 K lights. In the meantime, higher temperature light sources have become more popular, first with 10000 K and more recently 16000 K and 20000 K. Actinic lighting at the violet end of the visible range (420–460 nm) is used to allow night viewing without increasing algae bloom or enhancing photosynthesis, and to make the somewhat fluorescent colors of many corals and fish "pop", creating brighter display tanks.

Digital photography
In digital photography, the term color temperature sometimes refers to remapping of color values to simulate variations in ambient color temperature. Most digital cameras and raw image software provide presets simulating specific ambient values (e.g., sunny, cloudy, tungsten, etc.) while others allow explicit entry of white balance values in kelvins. These settings vary color values along the blue–yellow axis, while some software includes additional controls (sometimes labeled "tint") adding the magenta–green axis, and are to some extent arbitrary and a matter of artistic interpretation.

Photographic film

Photographic emulsion film does not respond to lighting color identically to the human retina or visual perception. An object that appears to the observer to be white may turn out to be very blue or orange in a photograph. The color balance may need to be corrected during printing to achieve a neutral color print.  The extent of this correction is limited since color film normally has three layers sensitive to different colors and when used under the "wrong" light source, every layer may not respond proportionally, giving odd color casts in the shadows, although the mid-tones may have been correctly white-balanced under the enlarger.  Light sources with discontinuous spectra, such as fluorescent tubes, cannot be fully corrected in printing either, since one of the layers may barely have recorded an image at all.

Photographic film is made for specific light sources (most commonly daylight film and tungsten film), and, used properly, will create a neutral color print. Matching the sensitivity of the film to the color temperature of the light source is one way to balance color. If tungsten film is used indoors with incandescent lamps, the yellowish-orange light of the tungsten incandescent lamps will appear as white (3200 K) in the photograph.  Color negative film is almost always daylight-balanced, since it is assumed that color can be adjusted in printing (with limitations, see above).  Color transparency film, being the final artefact in the process, has to be matched to the light source or filters must be used to correct color.

Filters on a camera lens, or color gels over the light source(s) may be used to correct color balance. When shooting with a bluish light (high color temperature) source such as on an overcast day, in the shade, in window light, or if using tungsten film with white or blue light, a yellowish-orange filter will correct this. For shooting with daylight film (calibrated to 5600 K) under warmer (low color temperature) light sources such as sunsets, candlelight or tungsten lighting, a bluish (e.g. #80A) filter may be used. More-subtle filters are needed to correct for the difference between, say 3200 K and 3400 K tungsten lamps or to correct for the slightly blue cast of some flash tubes, which may be 6000 K.

If there is more than one light source with varied color temperatures, one way to balance the color is to use daylight film and place color-correcting gel filters over each light source.

Photographers sometimes use color temperature meters. These are usually designed to read only two regions along the visible spectrum (red and blue); more expensive ones read three regions (red, green, and blue). However, they are ineffective with sources such as fluorescent or discharge lamps, whose light varies in color and may be harder to correct for. Because this light is often greenish, a magenta filter may correct it. More sophisticated colorimetry tools can be used if such meters are lacking.

Desktop publishing

In the desktop publishing industry, it is important to know a monitor's color temperature. Color matching software, such as Apple's ColorSync Utility for MacOS, measures a monitor's color temperature and then adjusts its settings accordingly. This enables on-screen color to more closely match printed color. Common monitor color temperatures, along with matching standard illuminants in parentheses, are as follows:

5000 K (CIE D50)
5500 K (CIE D55)
6500 K (D65)
7500 K (CIE D75)
9300 K

D50 is scientific shorthand for a standard illuminant: the daylight spectrum at a correlated color temperature of 5000 K. Similar definitions exist for D55, D65 and D75. Designations such as D50 are used to help classify color temperatures of light tables and viewing booths. When viewing a color slide at a light table, it is important that the light be balanced properly so that the colors are not shifted towards the red or blue.

Digital cameras, web graphics, DVDs, etc., are normally designed for a 6500 K color temperature. The sRGB standard commonly used for images on the Internet stipulates (among other things) a 6500 K display white point.

TV, video, and digital still cameras

The NTSC and PAL TV norms call for a compliant TV screen to display an electrically black and white signal (minimal color saturation) at a color temperature of 6500 K. On many consumer-grade televisions, there is a very noticeable deviation from this requirement. However, higher-end consumer-grade televisions can have their color temperatures adjusted to 6500 K by using a preprogrammed setting or a custom calibration. Current versions of ATSC explicitly call for the color temperature data to be included in the data stream, but old versions of ATSC allowed this data to be omitted. In this case, current versions of ATSC cite default colorimetry standards depending on the format. Both of the cited standards specify a 6500 K color temperature.

Most video and digital still cameras can adjust for color temperature by zooming into a white or neutral colored object and setting the manual "white balance" (telling the camera that "this object is white"); the camera then shows true white as white and adjusts all the other colors accordingly. White-balancing is necessary especially when indoors under fluorescent lighting and when moving the camera from one lighting situation to another. Most cameras also have an automatic white balance function that attempts to determine the color of the light and correct accordingly. While these settings were once unreliable, they are much improved in today's digital cameras and produce an accurate white balance in a wide variety of lighting situations.

Artistic application via control of color temperature

Video camera operators can white-balance objects that are not white, downplaying the color of the object used for white-balancing. For instance, they can bring more warmth into a picture by white-balancing off something that is light blue, such as faded blue denim; in this way white-balancing can replace a filter or lighting gel when those are not available.

Cinematographers do not "white balance" in the same way as video camera operators; they use techniques such as filters, choice of film stock, pre-flashing, and, after shooting, color grading, both by exposure at the labs and also digitally. Cinematographers also work closely with set designers and lighting crews to achieve the desired color effects.

For artists, most pigments and papers have a cool or warm cast, as the human eye can detect even a minute amount of saturation. Gray mixed with yellow, orange, or red is a "warm gray". Green, blue, or purple create "cool grays". Note that this sense of temperature is the reverse of that of real temperature; bluer is described as "cooler" even though it corresponds to a higher-temperature black body.

Lighting designers sometimes select filters by color temperature, commonly to match light that is theoretically white. Since fixtures using discharge type lamps produce a light of a considerably higher color temperature than do tungsten lamps, using the two in conjunction could potentially produce a stark contrast, so sometimes fixtures with HID lamps, commonly producing light of 6000–7000 K, are fitted with 3200 K filters to emulate tungsten light. Fixtures with color mixing features or with multiple colors (if including 3200 K), are also capable of producing tungsten-like light. Color temperature may also be a factor when selecting lamps, since each is likely to have a different color temperature.

Correlated color temperature

Motivation
Black-body radiators are the reference by which the whiteness of light sources is judged. A black body can be described by its temperature and produces light of a particular hue, as depicted above. This set of colors is called color temperature. By analogy, nearly Planckian light sources such as certain fluorescent or high-intensity discharge lamps can be judged by their correlated color temperature (CCT), the temperature of the Planckian radiator whose color best approximates them. For light source spectra that are not Planckian, matching them to that of a black body is not well defined; the concept of correlated color temperature was extended to map such sources as well as possible onto the one-dimensional scale of color temperature, where "as well as possible" is defined in the context of an objective color space.

Background

The notion of using Planckian radiators as a yardstick against which to judge other light sources is not new. In 1923, writing about "grading of illuminants with reference to quality of color ... the temperature of the source as an index of the quality of color", Priest essentially described CCT as we understand it today, going so far as to use the term "apparent color temperature", and astutely recognized three cases:
 "Those for which the spectral distribution of energy is identical with that given by the Planckian formula."
 "Those for which the spectral distribution of energy is not identical with that given by the Planckian formula, but still is of such a form that the quality of the color evoked is the same as would be evoked by the energy from a Planckian radiator at the given color temperature."
 "Those for which the spectral distribution of energy is such that the color can be matched only approximately by a stimulus of the Planckian form of spectral distribution."

Several important developments occurred in 1931. In chronological order:

 Raymond Davis published a paper on "correlated color temperature" (his term). Referring to the Planckian locus on the r-g diagram, he defined the CCT as the average of the "primary component temperatures" (RGB CCTs), using trilinear coordinates.
 The CIE announced the XYZ color space.
 Deane B. Judd published a paper on the nature of "least perceptible differences" with respect to chromatic stimuli. By empirical means he determined that the difference in sensation, which he termed ΔE for a "discriminatory step between colors ... Empfindung" (German for sensation) was proportional to the distance of the colors on the chromaticity diagram. Referring to the (r,g) chromaticity diagram depicted aside, he hypothesized that

KΔE = |c1 − c2| = max(|r1 − r2|, |g1 − g2|).

These developments paved the way for the development of new chromaticity spaces that are more suited to estimating correlated color temperatures and chromaticity differences. Bridging the concepts of color difference and color temperature, Priest made the observation that the eye is sensitive to constant differences in "reciprocal" temperature:

Priest proposed to use "the scale of temperature as a scale for arranging the chromaticities of the several illuminants in a serial order". Over the next few years, Judd published three more significant papers:

The first verified the findings of Priest, Davis, and Judd, with a paper on sensitivity to change in color temperature.

The second proposed a new chromaticity space, guided by a principle that has become the holy grail of color spaces: perceptual uniformity (chromaticity distance should be commensurate with perceptual difference). By means of a projective transformation, Judd found a more "uniform chromaticity space" (UCS) in which to find the CCT. Judd determined the "nearest color temperature" by simply finding the point on the Planckian locus nearest to the chromaticity of the stimulus on Maxwell's color triangle, depicted aside. The transformation matrix he used to convert X,Y,Z tristimulus values to R,G,B coordinates was:

From this, one can find these chromaticities:

The third depicted the locus of the isothermal chromaticities on the CIE 1931 x,y chromaticity diagram. Since the isothermal points formed normals on his UCS diagram, transformation back into the xy plane revealed them still to be lines, but no longer perpendicular to the locus.

Calculation
Judd's idea of determining the nearest point to the Planckian locus on a uniform chromaticity space is current. In 1937, MacAdam suggested a "modified uniform chromaticity scale diagram", based on certain simplifying geometrical considerations:

This (u,v) chromaticity space became the CIE 1960 color space, which is still used to calculate the CCT (even though MacAdam did not devise it with this purpose in mind). Using other chromaticity spaces, such as u'v''', leads to non-standard results that may nevertheless be perceptually meaningful.

This concept of distance has evolved to become Delta E, which continues to be used today.

Robertson's method
Before the advent of powerful personal computers, it was common to estimate the correlated color temperature by way of interpolation from look-up tables and charts. The most famous such method is Robertson's, who took advantage of the relatively even spacing of the mired scale (see above) to calculate the CCT Tc using linear interpolation of the isotherm's mired values:

If the isotherms are tight enough, one can assume , leading to

The distance of the test point to the i-th isotherm is given by

where  is the chromaticity coordinate of the i-th isotherm on the Planckian locus and mi is the isotherm's slope.

Precautions
Although the CCT can be calculated for any chromaticity coordinate, the result is meaningful only if the light source somewhat approximates a Planckian radiator. The CIE recommends that "The concept of correlated color temperature should not be used if the chromaticity of the test source differs more than [] from the Planckian radiator."

Approximation
If a narrow range of color temperatures is considered—those encapsulating daylight being the most practical case—one can approximate the Planckian locus in order to calculate the CCT in terms of chromaticity coordinates. Following Kelly's observation that the isotherms intersect in the purple region near (x = 0.325, y = 0.154), McCamy proposed this cubic approximation:

The maximum absolute error for color temperatures ranging from 2856 K (illuminant A) to 6504 K (D65) is under 2 K.

A more recent proposal, using exponential terms, considerably extends the applicable range by adding a second epicenter for high color temperatures:

where   is as before and the other constants are defined below:

The author suggests that one use the low-temperature equation to determine whether the higher-temperature parameters are needed.

Color rendering index
The CIE color rendering index (CRI) is a method to determine how well a light source's illumination of eight sample patches compares to the illumination provided by a reference source. Cited together, the CRI and CCT give a numerical estimate of what reference (ideal) light source best approximates a particular artificial light, and what the difference is. See Color Rendering Index for full article.

Spectral power distribution

Light sources and illuminants may be characterized by their spectral power distribution (SPD). The relative SPD curves provided by many manufacturers may have been produced using 10 nm increments or more on their spectroradiometer. The result is what would seem to be a smoother ("fuller spectrum") power distribution than the lamp actually has. Owing to their spiky distribution, much finer increments are advisable for taking measurements of fluorescent lights, and this requires more expensive equipment.

Color temperature in astronomy

In astronomy, the color temperature is defined by the local slope of the SPD at a given wavelength, or, in practice, a wavelength range. Given, for example, the color magnitudes B and V'' which are calibrated to be equal for an A0V star (e.g. Vega), the stellar color temperature  is given by the temperature for which the color index  of a black-body radiator fits the stellar one. The color temperature (as well as the correlated color temperature defined above) may differ largely from the effective temperature given by the radiative flux of the stellar surface. For example, the color temperature of an A0V star is about 15000 K compared to an effective temperature of about 9500 K.

For most applications in astronomy (e.g., to place a star on the HR diagram or to determine the temperature of a model flux fitting an observed spectrum) the effective temperature is the quantity of interest. Various color-effective temperature relations exist in the literature. There relations also have smaller dependencies on other stellar parameters, such as the stellar metallicity and surface gravity

See also
 Brightness temperature
 Color balance
 Effective temperature
 Kruithof curve
 Luminous efficacy
 Color metamerism
 Overillumination
 Whiteness

References

Further reading

External links
 Kelvin to RGB calculator from Academo.org
 Boyd, Andrew. Kelvin temperature in photography  at The Discerning Photographer.
 Charity, Mitchell. What color is a black body? sRGB values corresponding to blackbodies of varying temperature.
 Lindbloom, Bruce. ANSI C implementation of Robertson's method to calculate the correlated color temperature of a color in XYZ.
 Konica Minolta Sensing. The Language of Light.

Color
Lighting